John Mills (1848 – 14 April 1935) was an English cricketer who played in only one recorded first-class cricket match in 1870, this being the inaugural first-class match played by Gloucestershire against Surrey at Durdham Down in June 1870.  Mills had scored 17 runs during his batting period, with an average of 8.50. During the fielding period, he did not bowl but held one catch.

Bibliography
 Wisden Cricketers' Almanack, several volumes to 1879.

References

External links
 

1848 births
1935 deaths
English cricketers
English cricketers of 1864 to 1889
Gloucestershire cricketers